The Bethe–Feynman efficiency formula, a simple method for calculating the yield of a fission bomb, was first derived in 1943 after development in 1942. Aspects of the formula are speculated to be secret restricted data.

Related formula
a = internal energy per gram
b = growth rate
c = sphere radius

A numerical coefficient would then be included to create the Bethe–Feynman formula—increasing accuracy more than an order of magnitude.

Where γ is the thermodynamic exponent of a photon gas, E2 is the prompt energy density of the fuel, α is V_n (neutron velocity) / λ_mfp_tot (Total reaction mean free path), R_crit is the critical radius and 𝛿 is the excess supercritical radius .

See also
 Richard Feynman
 Hans Bethe
 Robert Serber

References

Nuclear physics
Richard Feynman